John Peers and Filip Polášek defeated Simone Bolelli and Fabio Fognini in the final, 7–5, 7–5, to win the men's doubles tennis title at the 2022 Sydney Tennis Classic.

Jamie Murray and Bruno Soares were the defending champions from when the tournament was last held in 2019, but they lost to Bolelli and Fognini in the second round.

Seeds 
All seeds received a bye into the second round.

Draw

Finals

Top half

Bottom half

References

External links 
 Draw

2022 Sydney Tennis Classic
2022 ATP Tour
Sydney